The Samsung Galaxy J3 Prime (also known as Galaxy J3 Emerge, Galaxy J3 Eclipse, Galaxy Express Prime 2 and Galaxy Amp Prime 2) is an Android smartphone manufactured by Samsung Electronics and was released in January 2017. It is mainly used as branded phone by mobile carriers.

Specifications

Hardware 
The Galaxy J3 Prime features a 5.0-inch TFT LCD display with HD ready (720x1280 pixels) resolution. The 5 MP rear camera features f/1.9 aperture, autofocus, LED flash and HDR. The 2 MP front camera has f/2.2 aperture.

All models have 1.5 GB RAM and 16 GB of internal storage which can be upgraded up to 256 GB via microSD card. The phone has a 2600 mAh removable battery. There are differences at the SoC which are differentiated down below:

Sprint
The Sprint-branded Galaxy J3 Emerge is powered by a Qualcomm Snapdragon 430 SoC including an octa-core 1.4 GHz ARM Cortex-A53 CPU and an Adreno 505 GPU.

 AT&T
The AT&T-branded Galaxy Express Prime 2 features an Exynos 7570 SoC including a quad-core 1.4 GHz Cortex-A53 CPU and an ARM Mali-T720 GPU.

 Boost Mobile, Cricket, T-Mobile, Verizon
The Galaxy J3 Prime (T-Mobile), Galaxy J3 Eclipse (Verizon), Galaxy Amp Prime 2 (Cricket) and Galaxy J3 Emerge (Boost Mobile) are powered by an Snapdragon 425 SoC including a quad-core 1.4 GHz Cortex-A53 CPU and an Adreno 308 GPU.

Software 
The J3 Prime is shipped with Android 6.0 "Marshmallow" and Samsung's TouchWiz user interface. AT&T and Cricket branded phones are shipped with Android 7.0 "Nougat" and Samsung Experience.

See also 
 Samsung Galaxy
 Samsung Galaxy J series

References 

Samsung Galaxy
Samsung smartphones
Android (operating system) devices
Mobile phones introduced in 2017
Discontinued smartphones
Mobile phones with user-replaceable battery